The Farmall H is a medium-sized two-plow row crop tractor produced by International Harvester under the Farmall brand from 1939 to 1954. It was the most widely produced of International Harvester's "letter series", with approximately 390,000 produced over the 14-year run. It succeeded the Farmall F-20. The H was incrementally updated with new model numbers as the Super H, 300, and 350, but remained essentially the same machine. The original H used an International Harvester C152 4-cylinder in-line engine. Production of all versions lasted until 1963.

Description and production
Styled by Raymond Loewy, it was one of International Harvester's "letter series", replacing the Farmall F-20. The H was rated for two  plows.

The H is equipped with a 4-cylinder in-line overhead valve with a  displacement and a 6-volt, positive ground electrical system with generator, (when so ordered or retrofitted). The sliding-gear transmission includes six total gears: five forward and one reverse. Early distillate and kerosene models started on gasoline and switched to their regular fuels once they were warmed up. A gasoline engine was added to the line in 1940.

The H was the smaller of the two prominent row crop tractors produced by IH from the late 1930s to the early 1950s, along with the Farmall M and its variants, yet could still use the same implements. As with the other letter-series IH tractors, the H used a modular design that allowed assemblies to be removed and replaced as units.

H variants
Versions were produced for gasoline, distillate and kerosene fuels. About 392,000 Hs of all kinds were produced, and sold for between $850 and $1,650.

Super H
About 29,000 Super H tractors were produced. The Super H was replaced by the Farmall 300.

Farmall 300

The Farmall 300 replaced the Super H in 1954, and was produced until 1956. It was restyled with chrome badging, adding a torque amplifier transmission and a  engine with a liquefied petroleum gas option, and dropping the option for distillate fuel.  Variants included the IH 300 utility tractor, and a 300 hiboy model. Total production was 29,077, with an additional 170 high-clearance models.

Farmall 350
The Farmall 350 replaced the 300 in 1956 as an interim measure pending the introduction of the Farmall 340. Built from 1956 to 1958, it was slightly restyled from the 300. A Continental diesel engine was available as an option. The 350 was gradually replaced by the newly designed Farmall 340 beginning in 1957. About 28,000 350s were produced. The 350 was produced as a utility tractor under the International Harvester 350 label, along with the IH 350 High-Utility high-clearance version, and the IH 350 Wheatland non-row-crop version.

Comparable products
Comparable products to the H include the John Deere B, Case SC, Massey 101 Junior, and the Minneapolis-Moline RTU. The Oliver Super 66, Ford 960 and John Deere 60 were comparable to the 300. The Case 511B, Massey MF65 and Minneapolis-Moline 445 were comparable to the 450.

See also
 McCormick-Deering W-4

References

External links 
NTTL Test #334 - Farmall H - Gasoline at the Nebraska Tractor Test Laboratory archive
NTTL Test #492 - Farmall Super H at the Nebraska Tractor Test Laboratory archive
NTTL Test #538 - McCormick Farmall Model 300 at the Nebraska Tractor Test Laboratory archive
NTTL Test #539 - International 300 Utility at the Nebraska Tractor Test Laboratory archive
NTTL Test #573 - McCormick Farmall Model 300 LPG at the Nebraska Tractor Test Laboratory archive
NTTL Test #574 - International 300 Utility LPG at the Nebraska Tractor Test Laboratory archive
NTTL Test #611 - McCormick Farmall 350 Gasoline at the Nebraska Tractor Test Laboratory archive
NTTL Test #609 - McCormick Farmall 350 Diesel at the Nebraska Tractor Test Laboratory archive
NTTL Test #610 - International 350 Utility at the Nebraska Tractor Test Laboratory archive
NTTL Test #615 - International 350 Utility Gasoline at the Nebraska Tractor Test Laboratory archive
NTTL Test #619 -  International 350 Utility LPG at the Nebraska Tractor Test Laboratory archive
NTTL Test #622 - McCormick Farmall 350 LPG at the Nebraska Tractor Test Laboratory archive

Farmall tractors
Vehicles introduced in 1939
Raymond Loewy